Ruboxistaurin (proposed brand name Arxxant) is an investigational drug for diabetic retinopathy being investigated by Eli Lilly and Company.  It is a member of the bisindolylmaleimide family.

In February 2006, Lilly submitted a New Drug Application for ruboxistaurin, and on August 18, 2006, Lilly received an approvable letter from the US FDA for ruboxistaurin, with a request for an additional clinical trial, which would take 5 years to complete.  Lilly has not made any further request for approval and ruboxistaurin is not approved by the FDA for any medical use.

Mechanism of action
Ruboxistaurin is an inhibitor of protein kinase C-beta.

References

External links
Eli Lilly and Company Product Pipeline

Eli Lilly and Company brands
Bisindolylmaleimides
Abandoned drugs